Sniper: Reloaded is a 2011 American direct to video action film which was directed by Claudio Fäh and was the fourth installment in the Sniper film series and a sequel to Sniper 3 (2004). This film is the first in the series of Sniper that does not feature the character of Thomas Beckett, who was portrayed by Tom Berenger.

Instead, it introduces his son Brandon, who was portrayed by Chad Michael Collins. Also, Billy Zane reprises his role as Richard Miller from the first film. The film was shot from 1 March 2010 to 3 April 2010 on location in Johannesburg, South Africa. It was released on DVD on April 26, 2011.

Plot
Marine Sgt. Brandon Beckett (Collins), the son of the previous Sniper film’s protagonist Thomas Beckett (Tom Berenger), takes up the mantle set by his father and goes on a mission of his own. While working with the UN Forces in the Democratic Republic of the Congo, Brandon Beckett receives orders to rescue a European farmer, Jean van Brunt (Rob Fruithoff), in the middle of hostile rebel territory.

When he and his men arrive at the farm, a mysterious sniper ambushes them, wounding Beckett and killing everyone else. With the help of his father’s former protégé, sniper instructor Richard Miller (Billy Zane), and UN Lieutenant Ellen Abramowitz (Annabel Wright) Beckett sets out on a personal mission to avenge the deaths of his team members.

In the resulting climax of the film, Beckett learns the identity of the sniper, ex-Marine Vincent “The Italian” Masiello (Justin Strydom), a former student of Miller’s who was acting under the orders of United Nations Colonel Ralf Jäger (Richard Sammel) to cover up an arms dealing conspiracy supplying weapons to both sides of an ongoing civil war. The mysterious sniper is finally killed by Brandon.

Shortly after apprehending Jäger, Beckett is offered the job by Miller for Special Operations.

Cast

 Chad Michael Collins as Sergeant Brandon Beckett 
 Billy Zane as Richard Miller
 Richard Sammel as Colonel Ralf Jäger
 Patrick Lyster as Martin Chandler
 Annabel Wright as Lieutenant Ellen Abramowitz
 Kayla Privett as Kelli Van Brunt
 Justin Strydom as Vincent “The Italian” Masiello
 Conrad Kemp as Captain Dustin Nelson
 Hlomla Dandala as Kyle Brown
 Nic Rasenti as Vincent Capobianco
 Ian Van Der Heyden as Patrick Mundy
 Justin Shaw as Martin Hoag
 Rob Fruithof as Jean Van Brunt
 Khulum M. Skenjana as Captain Sporo Ngoba
 Clyde Berning as Marine Sniper Nakelski
 Martin Le Maitre as JAG Hiram Clarke
 Adrian Waldron as SOCOM Commander

References

External links
 
 

2011 films
2011 action films
Films shot in Gauteng
Films about the United States Marine Corps
Films directed by Claudio Fäh
Films about snipers
Direct-to-video sequel films
Stage 6 Films films
Sony Pictures direct-to-video films
American action films
Sniper (film series)
2010s English-language films
2010s American films